Franklin Township is one of twelve townships in Hendricks County, Indiana, United States. As of the 2010 census, its population was 1,297.

History
McCormack-Bowman House was added to the National Register of Historic Places in 1995.

Geography
The streams of Crittenden Creek and East Fork Mill Creek run through this township.

Cities and towns
 Stilesville

Adjacent townships
 Clay Township (north)
 Liberty Township (east)
 Monroe Township, Morgan County (east)
 Adams Township, Morgan County (south)
 Jefferson Township, Putnam County (southwest)
 Marion Township, Putnam County (west)

Cemeteries
The township contains five cemeteries: Hebron Presbyterian, Pleasant Hill, Snoddy Family, Stilesville and Walnut Grove.

Major highways
  U.S. Route 40
  State Road 75

Airports and landing strips
 Vaughn Airport

References
 
 United States Census Bureau cartographic boundary files

External links

Townships in Hendricks County, Indiana
Townships in Indiana